Sándor Lévai (July 16, 1935 – October 12, 2009) was an international speedway rider from Hungary.

Speedway career 
Lévai was six times champion of Hungary, winning the Hungarian Championship for six consecutive years from 1951 to 1956. He rode in the top tier of British Speedway from 1965 to 1975, riding for various clubs.

References 

1935 births
2009 deaths
Hungarian speedway riders
Belle Vue Aces riders
Cradley Heathens riders
Ipswich Witches riders
Newport Wasps riders
Norwich Stars riders
Stoke Potters riders
Sportspeople from Debrecen